John-Hubert Meyer (born 19 September 1993) is a South African rugby union player for the  in Super Rugby and in the Currie Cup and the  in the Rugby Challenge. He can play as a loosehead or tighthead prop.

Rugby career

2012 : Sharks Under-19

Meyer was born in Cape Town and attended Paul Roos Gymnasium in nearby Stellenbosch. He never earned a provincial call-up for  during his school career and moved to Durban to join the  after finishing school. He was named on the bench for all thirteen of the 's matches during the 2012 Under-19 Provincial Championship, scoring a try in their 46–3 victory over the s and two tries in their final match of the regular season, a 47–45 victory over the s. The Sharks finished in third place to qualify for the semi-finals, where they lost to the s.

2014–2015 : Western Province Under-21 and Maties

Meyer moved back to Cape Town to join the  team for their Under-21 Provincial Championship season. He started their 29–22 victory over the same opposition in their semi-final and in the final, where he finished on the winning side, as Western Province beat the Blue Bulls 33–26 in Cape Town.

At the start of 2015, Meyer represented the Stellenbosch University's rugby team  in the Varsity Cup competition. He played in six of their seven matches, scoring a try in their narrow defeat to eventual champions , but could not help Maties into the semi-finals, with the three-time champions finishing in fifth place.

2016–present : Sharks and UKZN Impi

Meyer again made the move to Durban for the 2016 season. He started the season with five appearances in the Varsity Shield competition for the KwaZulu-Natal university side .

He made a further four appearances for the team as they finished in tenth place on the log.

At the end of October 2016, Meyer was included in the  Super Rugby squad for the 2017 season.

References

South African rugby union players
Living people
1993 births
Rugby union players from Cape Town
Rugby union props
Sharks (Currie Cup) players
Sharks (rugby union) players
AS Béziers Hérault players